Sabey Data Centers is a private company based in Tukwila, Washington that owns or operates data centers in Ashburn, Virginia; Quincy, East Wenatchee, and Seattle in Washington state; and New York City, with more than three million square feet of data center operations  2020. In May 2020 the company issued $800 million in debt for expansion. The company was worth $600 million in 2012 and owns New York's largest special purpose data center, 375 Pearl Street. The company negotiated a 30-year hydroelectric power contract from Bonneville Power Administration at the remarkably low price of 2.25 cents per kilowatt.

References

External links

Companies based in Tukwila, Washington
Privately held companies based in Washington (state)